Čeľadince is a municipality in the Topoľčany District of the Nitra Region, Slovakia. In 2011 had a population of 446 inhabitants.

Etymology
The name comes from the Slovak word čeľaď: a family with servants, or alternatively servants at the feudal court.

See also
 List of municipalities and towns in Slovakia

References

Genealogical resources

The records for genealogical research are available at the state archive "Statny Archiv in Nitra, Slovakia"

 Roman Catholic church records (births/marriages/deaths): 1831-1895 (parish B)
 Lutheran church records (births/marriages/deaths): 1708-1895 (parish B)

External links
 Čeľadince
Official homepage
Surnames of living people in Celadince

Villages and municipalities in Topoľčany District